Schnelsen is a quarter of Hamburg, Germany, in the borough of Eimsbüttel. In 2020 it had a population of over 30,100 people and borders the state of Schleswig-Holstein.

Geography
Schnelsen borders with the quarters Eidelstedt and Niendorf. It also borders with Rellingen, Ellerbek and Bönningstedt in the Kreis Pinneberg as well as Norderstedt in Segeberg, which are both parts of Schleswig-Holstein.

Politics
These are the results of Schnelsen in the Hamburg state election:

Transportation
Schnelsen has access to the AKN and 8 different bus lines.

References

Quarters of Hamburg
Eimsbüttel